Oscar Peterson et Joe Pass à Salle Pleyel is an album by Oscar Peterson and Joe Pass that was released in 1975.

Track listing

Personnel
 Oscar Peterson - piano
 Joe Pass - guitar
 Norman Granz - producer

Chart positions

References

Oscar Peterson live albums
Joe Pass live albums
Albums produced by Norman Granz
1975 live albums
Pablo Records live albums